Creve Coeur is a village in Groveland Township, Tazewell County, Illinois, United States. As of the 2020 census, the village population was 4,934. Creve Coeur is a suburb of Peoria and is part of the Peoria, Illinois Metropolitan Statistical Area.

Geography
Creve Coeur is located at  (40.6422705 -89.5987040).

Demographics

At the 2000 census there were 5,448 people, 2,219 households, and 1,488 families in the village. The racial makeup of the village was 97.14% White, 0.39% African American, 0.53% Native American, 0.18% Asian, 0.02% Pacific Islander, 0.81% from other races, and 0.94% from two or more races. Hispanic or Latino of any race were 1.95%.

Of the 2,219 households 28.8% had children under the age of 18 living with them, 50.2% were married couples living together, 12.2% had a female householder with no husband present, and 32.9% were non-families. 27.2% of households were one person and 9.8% were one person aged 65 or older. The average household size was 2.46 and the average family size was 2.97.

The age distribution was 24.7% under the age of 18, 8.9% from 18 to 24, 30.5% from 25 to 44, 22.6% from 45 to 64, and 13.3% 65 or older. The median age was 36 years. For every 100 females, there were 97.9 males. For every 100 females age 18 and over, there were 95.2 males.

The median household income was $36,138 and the median family income  was $41,006. Males had a median income of $32,188 versus $21,302 for females. The per capita income for the village was $16,712. About 4.5% of families and 7.3% of the population were below the poverty line, including 7.6% of those under age 18 and 5.5% of those age 65 or over.

See also

 Fort Crevecoeur
 List of towns and villages in Illinois
 Creve Coeur, Missouri
 Peoria, Illinois

References

External links
 Creve Coeur Police Dept.
 Creve Coeur School District 76

Villages in Tazewell County, Illinois
Villages in Illinois
Peoria metropolitan area, Illinois